The European Federalist Movement (Movimento Federalista Europeo, MFE) was founded in Milan in 1943 by a group of activists led by Altiero Spinelli. The principles which inspired its foundation are contained in the Ventotene Manifesto, drawn up in 1941 by Spinelli himself,
Eugenio Colorni, Ursula Hirschmann and Ernesto Rossi. Vayssière notes that the manifesto is widely seen as the birth of European federalism. Spinelli (1907–86), a former Communist, became a leader of the federalist movement due to his primary authorship of the Manifesto and his postwar advocacy. The manifesto called for a break with Europe's past to form a new political system through a restructuring of politics and extensive social reform. It was presented not as an ideal, but as the best option for the Europe's postwar condition.

Federalism represented in the 1940s a revolutionary and entirely innovative political idea. According to the federalists, the new line between progressive and reactionary forces was the one that existed between those for whom the key task is to create a federal European state, and those who consciously or de facto acted to maintain a diversity of sovereign nation-states.

Further reading
  Richard J. Mayne, John Pinder and John C. De V. Roberts. Federal Union: The Pioneers: A History of Federal Union (1990) 
Bertrand Vayssière, "Le Manifeste de Ventotene (1941): Acte de Naissance du Federalisme Europeen," Guerres Mondiales et Conflits Contemporains (Jan 2005), Vol. 55 Issue 217, pp69–76

External links
The archives of the European Federalist Movement are available at the  Historical Archives of the EU in Florence.

See also
Union of European Federalists
1943 establishments in Italy
Defunct political parties in Italy
European federalist parties
Federalist parties in Italy
Political parties established in 1943
Political parties with year of disestablishment missing